Russian Dolls is an American reality television series on Lifetime. The series debuted on August 11, 2011 and finished on October 7, 2011. The series follows the lives of eight Russian-American families living in Brighton Beach, New York.

Production and Cancellation
The show premiered on August 11, 2011 at 10:30/9:30c following hit series Project Runway. The show premiered to low ratings with a 0.4 rating in adults 18–49 demo and only 0.97 million viewers watching the episode. While the series was in pre-production, Lifetime originally chose to name the series 'Brighton Beach but was later changed to its current title. The series was deemed a Jersey Shore-esque reality series even before the title change.

On August 23, 2011, Lifetime moved the series to a later time slot, at 11:30/10:30c following a Dance Moms repeat. On September 21, 2011, Lifetime announced that the series will be burned off and the last five episodes of the series aired on October 7, 2011, as a special marathon event.

Episodes

Reception
The New York Press stated that "while Russian Dolls is ultimately a Brooklyn Jersey Shore, its unique focus on and respect for Russian culture and parenthood elevates it above the typical reality show drivel." The Wall Street Journal wrote that "Having the opportunity to mash up something as Russian as Brighton Beach with something as American as reality TV really drives home the fact that there’s a place where KGB-era ways and Kim Kardashian can meet."

The show has been criticized for having Ukrainian women appear as some of its "Russian dolls". The Boston Herald noted that the show "reinforces every negative stereotype about Russian women." Pravda.ru described the show as "a spit in Russia's face." The New York Times remarked that "If the Soviet authorities had wanted to torture Aleksandr Solzhenitsyn beyond endurance, they would have forced him to watch Russian Dolls." AM New York describes the show as "so busily edited ...that there’s no flavor of any kind" adding that "If nothing else, this show might make us more appreciative of all the effort those “Jersey Shore” folks put into their portrayals."

References

2010s American reality television series
2011 American television series debuts
2011 American television series endings
English-language television shows
Lifetime (TV network) original programming
Russian-American culture in New York City
Television shows set in New York City